Pauline Frost is a Canadian politician, who was elected to the Legislative Assembly of Yukon in the 2016 election. She represented the electoral district of Vuntut Gwitchin as a member of the Yukon Liberal Party and served one term.

Prior to entering territorial politics, Frost worked for the Vuntut Gwitchin Government as their negotiator, Intergovernmental Coordinator, and senior official for past six years. She was the President of the Vuntut Gwitchin Limited Partnership, Chair of the Yukon Salmon Sub-Committee, and sat on the Air North Board and the Yukon First Nations Culture and Tourism Association. Previously, she worked as the Director of the Yukon First Nations Self Government Secretariat.

On November 7, 2016, Frost defeated Yukon Party incumbent Darius Elias in the Yukon riding of Vuntut Gwitchin. Elias, a former Liberal MLA, had crossed the floor after the last election to join the Yukon Party. Frost's narrow margin of victory (7 votes) led to a judicial recount, which ultimately confirmed her victory.

Frost was sworn into Cabinet on December 3, 2016, as the Minister of Health and Social Services, Minister of the Environment, and Minister responsible for the Yukon Housing Corporation. She is the first Cabinet minister from Old Crow in more than three decades.

In the 2021 election, Frost tied with NDP candidate Annie Blake. After a judicial recount confirmed each candidate received 78 votes, Blake's name was drawn at random, thus denying Frost another term.

She was born and raised in Old Crow.

Electoral record

Yukon general election, 2016

|-

| style="width: 130px" |Liberal
|Pauline Frost
|align="right"| 77
|align="right"| 51.3%
|align="right"| -12.8%

|NDP
|Skeeter Miller-Wright
|align="right"| 3
|align="right"| 2.0%
|align="right"| +2.0%
|- bgcolor="white"
!align="left" colspan=3|Total
!align="right"| 150
!align="right"| 100.0%
!align="right"| –

References

Yukon Liberal Party MLAs
Women MLAs in Yukon
Living people
21st-century Canadian politicians
21st-century Canadian women politicians
Members of the Executive Council of Yukon
Women government ministers of Canada
Year of birth missing (living people)